The men's basketball tournament at the 2021 Southeast Asian Games was held at the Thanh Trì District Sporting Hall in Hanoi, Vietnam from 16 to 22 May 2022.

Competition schedule
The following is the competition schedule for the men's basketball competitions:

Participating nations

Competition format
The seven teams compete in a single round-robin. Three highest-ranked teams will be awarded gold, silver and bronze medal.

Venue
The regular 5-on-5 basketball tournament was held at the Thanh Trì District Sporting Hall in Hanoi.

Results

Round-robin
All times are Vietnam Standard Time (UTC+7)

Final standings

See also
Women's tournament

References

Men